Oceanic were an English electronic dance music group, consisting of David Harry, Frank Crofts and singer Jorinde Williams.

Biography
The band were most famous for the dance hit song, "Insanity", which was released in 1991. This was the group's biggest commercial success, reaching No. 3 in the UK singles chart for three weeks and the ninth biggest-selling UK single of 1991. The track also made the Australian Top 40.

Later that year they released the follow-up, "Wicked Love", which reached No. 25 in the UK singles chart. In 1992 the act released their first and only album, entitled That Compact Disc By Oceanic, (also, That Cassette/LP By Oceanic for the audio cassette/LP versions respectively) which featured two different versions of "Insanity", and reached a chart position of No. 49 before dropping out of the UK Albums Chart after only 2 weeks. A third single, "Controlling Me", made No. 14 in the UK chart. Their final song to appear on the charts was "Ignorance" (with Siobhan Maher Kennedy), which was on the UK chart at No. 72 for one week in November 1992.

The group performed on several TV shows between 1991–1993, including four appearances on Top of the Pops, plus The Hitman and Her and an episode of Frank Sidebottom's Fantastic Shed Show.

In 2006, the track "Insanity" featured on The Hitman and Her compilation CD.

Discography

Albums
 That (CD/Cassette/Album) by Oceanic (1991)

Singles

References

Further reading

External links
David Harry's website
Oceanic's Facebook page
[ Discography at AllMusic]

English electronic music groups
English techno music groups
English house music groups
Warner Music Group artists